The 1987–88 Northern Football League season was the 90th in the history of Northern Football League, a football competition in England.

Division One

Division One featured 17 clubs which competed in the division last season, along with three new clubs, promoted from Division Two:
 Billingham Synthonia
 Guisborough Town
 Shildon

League table

Division Two

Division Two featured 16 clubs which competed in the division last season, along with two new clubs, relegated from Division One:
 Bedlington Terriers
 Peterlee Newtown

Also, Seaham Colliery Welware changed name to Seaham Red Star.

League table

References

External links
 Northern Football League official site

Northern Football League seasons
1987–88 in English football leagues